The Luxembourg 2. Division is the fourth tier of the Luxembourg football league system. There are a total of 28 teams in the division, which are split into two groups of 14.

2021–22 clubs

Serie 1

Serie 2

Previous winners

References
2. Division Serie 1 results and standings at FLF.lu
2. Division Serie 2 results and standings at FLF.lu

4
Fourth level football leagues in Europe